Algazino (Malti İşek) is a rural locality (a village) in Vurnarsky District of the Chuvash Republic, (Russia). The village is the administrative center of Algazinskoye Rural Settlement, one of the municipal formations of Vurnarsky District.

The chief of the rural formation is Igor A. Ivanov.

References

Notable people 
 Praski Vitti, chuvash painter

External links
Official website of Algazinskoye Rural Settlement 

Vurnarsky District

Rural localities in Chuvashia